Sullivan North High School was a public high school (grades 9–12) located in Kingsport, Tennessee under the authority of Sullivan County Schools. Opened in 1980, the school had a student body of approximately 1500 students. However, due to declining enrollment partly from annexation by the city of Kingsport, enrollment was reduced to approximately 600 students at the time of amalgamation into West Ridge High School in 2021. Sullivan North's former facilities were used to form John Sevier Middle School  until 2022. The facility became Tribe Athletic Complex, which held middle school and youth league games and practices. Dobyns-Bennett basketball team had their season in the former Sullivan North gym due to roof problems with the Buck Van Huss dome.

Academics
Sullivan North used a modified  block schedule with four 60- to 80-minute periods and one 45-minute class each day. It offered several "accelerated", AP, and technical/vocational courses, including computer-aided design, carpentry, culinary arts, and criminal justice. It participated in a program with Northeast State Community College allowing seniors to take classes for both high school and college credit in the areas of advanced English and humanities/public speaking.

Extracurriculars
Sullivan North High School had athletics programs for basketball, baseball, cheerleading, cross country, football, golf, softball, tennis, track and field, volleyball, and marching band. Clubs included chapters of the National Beta Club, FBLA, FCCLA, FCA, Key Club International, HOSA, National Honor Society, and SkillsUSA. The school also had a student council and Navy JROTC Program.

References

External links
 
 School Improvement Plan

Educational institutions established in 1980
Public high schools in Tennessee
Kingsport, Tennessee
Schools in Sullivan County, Tennessee
1980 establishments in Tennessee